Danny Byrd (born 4 May 1979) is an English DJ, record producer and musician from Bath in the South West of England. He is influenced by genres such as house, UK garage, R&B and the jungle sound. He primarily releases his music through Hospital Records, the UK-based independent dance music label. In 2009, his track "Red Mist VIP" reached number one on the UK Dance Chart on the week ending 25 July 2009,
and on 7 February 2010, his remix of Liquid's Sweet Harmony gave him his first success on the UK Singles Chart, making No. 64. In October 2010, Byrd reached No. 36 in the UK Singles Chart with the track "Ill Behaviour".

History
Byrd was one of the first artists to sign to Hospital Records in 1999. His first Hospital singles were Do It Again and Changes.

In 2000, BBC Radio 1's Fabio championed Danny's remix of London Elektricity's Wishing Well. Remixes by Byrd for High Contrast and contributions to the Hospital Records compilation Weapons of Mass Creation followed.

In 2008, Byrd's debut studio album Supersized was released on Hospital Records, including notable tracks like Shock Out, Gold Rush, Weird Science and Red Mist. Red Mist VIP, a new version of the latter track, appeared on Hospital's compilation Sick Music and has appeared in the film Dead Man Running and computer games Midnight Club LA and DJ Hero.

Byrd second studio album Rave Digger was released in October 2010. The lead single "Ill Behaviour" (featuring I-Kay) has been supported by MistaJam, Annie Mac and Sara Cox on BBC Radio 1. The single was promoted to Radio 1's A-list on 8 September 2010.

His album Golden Ticket was released in June 2013.

In September 2018, he released his latest album Atomic Funk.

In October 2021, Byrd signed with Ministry of Sound.

Discography

Albums

Compilation albums

Mixtape

Singles

Remixes

Other songs
1998 – "Manhattan"
2000 – "The Strutt" / "Walk Tall"
2004 – "Planet Music" (with Adrok featuring MC Foxy)
2007 – "Under the Sea"
2009 – "California" (with Zarif)
2014 – "Supersonic"

References

External links

Danny Byrd at Hospital Records

Danny Byrd Essential Mix 2010

Hospital Records artists
Living people
English DJs
English drum and bass musicians
English electronic musicians
English record producers
Electronic dance music DJs
People educated at Beechen Cliff School
1979 births
Musicians from Bath, Somerset
People educated at Bath College